Shanelle Jackson (born June 15, 1980) is an American politician who served in the Michigan House of Representatives from the 9th district from 2007 to 2012, and later worked in the private sector.

Jackson earned a B.A. from the University of Michigan in political science and an M.A. from Marygrove College in social justice.

References

External links
 Shanelle

1980 births
20th-century African-American people
20th-century African-American women
21st-century African-American women
21st-century American politicians
21st-century American women politicians
African-American state legislators in Michigan
African-American women in politics
Candidates in the 2022 United States House of Representatives elections
Living people
Marygrove College alumni
Democratic Party members of the Michigan House of Representatives
Politicians from Detroit
University of Michigan alumni
Women state legislators in Michigan